Spyridium polycephalum is a species of flowering plant in the family Rhamnaceae and is endemic to the south of Western Australia. It grows in heathlands and shrublands on coastal dunes, rocky hillsides and plains in the Avon Wheatbelt, Coolgardie, Esperance Plains and Mallee bioregions of southern Western Australia.

This spyridium was first formally described in 1858 by Nikolai Turczaninow, who gave it the name Trimalium polycephalum in the Bulletin de la Société Impériale des Naturalistes de Moscou from specimens collected by James Drummond. In 1995, Barbara Lynette Rye changed the name to Spyridium polycephalum in the journal Nuytsia. The specific epithet (polycephalum) means "many-headed".

References

polycephalum
Rosales of Australia
Flora of Western Australia
Plants described in 1858
Taxa named by Nikolai Turczaninow